Celaenorrhinus sagamase, commonly known as the Sagamase sprite, is a species of butterfly in the family Hesperiidae. It is found in Ghana. The habitat consists of forests.

Etymology
The species is named for the Sagyamase Trail, the main access road to the Atewa Range in Ghana.

References

Endemic fauna of Ghana
Butterflies described in 2005
sagamase